Lalit Thapa is an Indian professional footballer who plays as a goalkeeper for I-League side Gokulam Kerala.

Club career
Thapa joined Churchill Brothers in 2010. Thapa was critical in Churchill Brothers 2013-14 season, especially in a game against S.C. Goa and the 3-1 win in the Federation's final also against Goa.

After it was announced that the Churchill Brothers would not take part in the 2014–15 I-League Thapa says it is likely that he will join another team in the ISL or IMG. On the AIFF's decision to suspend Churchill Brothers from the league Thapa says "I really don't know what to say [about Churchill Brothers not being in I-League]. There are a lot of players who are contracted with the club," he said."

Then he joined Sporting Clube de Goa later.

In July 2015 Thapa was drafted to play for FC Pune City in the 2015 Indian Super League.

International career
Although born in India Thapa is of Nepalese descent and thus eligible to play for either India or Nepal, although he has not made a senior appearance for either team.

Personal life
Thapa is a Nepali Indian. His favorite team is Brazil national football team.

Honours
Individual
2016 Manipur State League Best Player

References

External links
 
 Goal.com Profile

1984 births
Living people
Footballers from Manipur
Indian Gorkhas
Indian footballers
Churchill Brothers FC Goa players
Sporting Clube de Goa players
FC Pune City players
I-League players
Association football goalkeepers